Atula Sanda Dewi was the chief queen consort of King Kyawswa I of Pinya. The queen, whose personal name was "Nan Lon Me" (နန်းလုံးမယ်), was a granddaughter of King Kyawswa of Pagan. She was the mother of the last three kings of Pinya: Uzana II, Kyawswa II and Narathu.

Notes

References

Bibliography
 

Pagan dynasty
Queens consort of Pinya
14th-century Burmese women